The Railways football team is an Indian football team representing the Indian Railways in Indian state football competitions including the  Santosh Trophy.

They have appeared in the Santosh Trophy finals nine times, and have won the trophy thrice.

Honours
 Santosh Trophy
 Winners (3): 1961–62, 1964–65, 1966–67
 Runners-up (6): 1971–72, 1973–74, 1980–81, 1981–82, 1986–87, 2013–14

 M. Dutta Ray Trophy
 Winners (2): 1997, 1998

References

Santosh Trophy teams
Sport in Indian Railways
Railway association football clubs in India